This article displays the qualifying draw for women's singles at the 2016 Australian Open.

The loss of Francesca Schiavone in the second round ended her streak of consecutive appearances in the main draw of Grand Slam singles events at 61, the second longest streak after Ai Sugiyama, in the Open Era.

Seeds

Qualifiers

Draw

First qualifier

Second qualifier

Third qualifier

Fourth qualifier

Fifth qualifier

Sixth qualifier

Seventh qualifier

Eighth qualifier

Ninth qualifier

Tenth qualifier

Eleventh qualifier

Twelfth qualifier

References

External links
 Qualifying Draw
 2016 Australian Open – Women's draws and results at the International Tennis Federation

Women's Singles Qualifying
Australian Open (tennis) by year – Qualifying